Allan Trusler (23 June 1933 – 9 April 2022) was an Australian rules footballer who played for the Footscray Football Club in the Victorian Football League (VFL).

Notes

External links 
		

1933 births
2022 deaths
Australian rules footballers from Victoria (Australia)
Western Bulldogs players